Bruce Henley Halford (18 May 1931 – 2 December 2001) was a British racing driver from England. He was born in Hampton-in-Arden (then in Warwickshire) and educated at Blundell's School

He died in Churston Ferrers, Devon. Halford's obituary in The Daily Telegraph described him as "one of the last of the 1950s' select band of private-entrant owner-drivers from the heyday of the classical front-engined Grand Prix car."

Complete Formula One World Championship results
(key)

References

English racing drivers
English Formula One drivers
British Racing Partnership Formula One drivers
1931 births
2001 deaths
People educated at Blundell's School
24 Hours of Le Mans drivers
World Sportscar Championship drivers

Ecurie Ecosse drivers